Cosmardia is a genus of moths in the family Gelechiidae.

Species
Cosmardia moritzella (Treitschke, 1835)

References

Gnorimoschemini